Larry Darnell Flowers (born April 19, 1958) is a former professional American football player who played safety for five seasons for the New York Giants and the New York Jets.

1958 births
Living people
People from Temple, Texas
Players of American football from Texas
American football safeties
Texas Tech Red Raiders football players
New York Giants players
New York Jets players